West Virginia's 5th Senate district is one of 17 districts in the West Virginia Senate. It is currently represented by Democrats Robert Plymale and Mike Woelfel. All districts in the West Virginia Senate elect two members to staggered four-year terms.

Geography
District 5 is based in the city of Huntington, covering all of Cabell County and parts of northern Wayne County. It also includes the communities of Milton, Barboursville, Culloden, Lesage, Pea Ridge, Ceredo, and Kenova.

The district is located entirely within West Virginia's 3rd congressional district, and overlaps with the 16th, 17th, 18th, and 19th districts of the West Virginia House of Delegates. It borders the states of Ohio and Kentucky.

Recent election results

2022

Historical election results

2020

2018

2016

2014

2012

Federal and statewide results in District 5

References

5
Cabell County, West Virginia
Wayne County, West Virginia